Roman court can refer to either:

the court of the secular ruler in Rome, notably the Roman Emperor
the Roman Curia, the ecclesiastical court of the Pope of Rome